Bunda de Fora is a sport climb located in Acephale, Alberta, Canada. At a climbing grade of 9a (5.14d), it is one of the most difficult climbs in North America and one of Canada's hardest sport climbs.

History
Bunda de Fora was first bolted by Ryan Johnstone; however, it remained unclimbed for a number of years until Lev Pinter established the first ascent in 2006. Unsure of the grade, Pinter proposed a grade of 5.14c. Repeat ascentionists have since upgraded the climb to 5.14d.

In the summer of 2011, a crucial hold broke, which significantly increased the difficulty and duration of the crux sequence as well as increasing the difficulty of clipping. However, the grade remained unchanged at 5.14d. The climb has seen four repeats since the hold broke. It is worth noting the first three ascentionists used dramatically different sequences through the broken section.

The climb
Bunda de Fora sits nestled in one of two prominent steep caves at the Upper Wall of Acephale. These two caves house the majority of the 5.14s at Acephale as well as some 5.13+ climbs.  The climb is 20 m long. Although relatively short, the difficulty of the moves and number of difficult moves are enough to support the grade, making it a notable power endurance test piece.

The phrase  is Portuguese, roughly translated as 'ass (arse) out'. It is a term referring to bar (pub) patrons sitting off the edge of their stools. The route is named for its namesake move where one must set a toe hook and stick one's backside out from the wall in order to execute a crux move.

Route description
Bunda de Fora opens with difficult climbing on small edges and difficult clips. From there a long V13 (8b) crux sequence through a roof awaits. A large hold at the lip of the roof after the crux allows climbers to catch their breath before the final technical 5.13c push to the anchors.

Ascents
 Lev Pinter (FA) August 2006 
 Dave Graham September 2007 
 Joe Kinder September 2012
 Josh Muller September 2012
 Evan Hau August 2013
 Alex Megos July 2016

See also
"Saving Summer" by Joe Kinder at Vimeo

References

Climbing routes